Redleg is a term used to refer to poor whites  that live or at one time lived on Barbados, St. Vincent, Grenada and a few other Caribbean islands. Their forebears were sent from England, Scotland, Ireland, and Continental Europe as indentured servants, forced labourers, or peons.

Etymology 
According to folk etymology, the name is derived from the effects of the tropical sun on the fair-skinned legs of white emigrants, now known as sunburn. However, the term "Redlegs" and its variants were also in use for Irish soldiers who were taken as prisoners of war in the Irish Confederate Wars and transported to Barbados as indentured servants. The variant "Red-shankes" is recorded as early as the 16th century by Edmund Spenser in his dialogue on the current social condition of Ireland.

In addition to "Redlegs", the term underwent extensive progression in Barbados and the following terms were also used: "Redshanks", "Poor whites", "Poor Backra", "Backra Johnny", "Ecky-Becky", "Johnnies" or "Poor Backward Johnnies", "Poor whites from below the hill", "Edey white mice" or "Beck-e Neck" (Baked-neck). Historically everything besides "poor whites" was used as derogatory insults.

History 
Many of the Redlegs' ancestors were transported by Oliver Cromwell after his conquest of Ireland. Others had originally arrived on Barbados in the early to mid-17th century as indentured servants, to work on the sugar plantations. Small groups of Germans and Portuguese prisoners of war were also imported as plantation labourers.

By the 18th century, indentured servants became less common. African slaves were trained in all necessary trades, so there was no demand for paid white labour. The Redlegs, in turn, were unwilling to work alongside the freed black population on the plantations. Therefore, most tried to emigrate to other European colonies whenever the opportunity arose, which reduced the white population to a small minority; and most of the white population that chose to stay eked out, at best, a subsistence living. The Redleg descendants of indentured servants today are extremely poor, almost all living in shacks in the countryside.

Because of the deplorable conditions under which the Redlegs lived, a campaign was initiated in the mid-19th century to move portions of the population to other islands which would be more economically hospitable. The relocation process succeeded, and a distinct community of Redleg descendants live in the Dorsetshire Hill District on St. Vincent as well as on the islands of Grenada around Mt. Moritz and Bequia.

"Redleg descendants are still present on Barbados today – some of them in absolute poverty – isolated, unassimilated and uneducated." The term "Redleg" is also used in South Carolina, where Barbadians had settled.

See also

Béké
Buckra
Zoreilles
White Caribbeans
History of South Carolina
Irish immigration to Saint Kitts and Nevis
Irish immigration to Barbados
Irish people in Jamaica
Irish indentured servitude
Irish slaves myth
Red Strangers -  a novelized account of the arrival and effects of European settlers to colonial Kenya

References

External links
Poor Scots who became white trash, Rebels, Covenanters - all sorts of 'redlegs' were shipped to Barbados over the centuries. The Sunday Times, 6 March 2005 (archived 10 Apr 2013)
Barbados and the Melungeons of Appalachia. L.E. Salazar, The Multiracial Activist, 2002

English Caribbean
Irish Caribbean
Scottish Caribbean
Ethnic groups in the Caribbean
History of the Colony of Barbados
Ethnic groups in Grenada
European Barbadian
Ethnic groups in Saint Vincent and the Grenadines
Poverty in North America
White Caribbean
Working class in North America